Jhenaidah-3 is a constituency represented in the Jatiya Sangsad (National Parliament) of Bangladesh since 2019 by Shafiqul Azam Khan of the Awami League.

Boundaries 
The constituency encompasses Kotchandpur and Maheshpur upazilas.

History 
The constituency was created in 1984 from a Jessore constituency when the former Jessore District was split into four districts: Jhenaidah, Jessore, Magura, and Narail.

Members of Parliament

Elections

Elections in the 2010s

Elections in the 2000s

Elections in the 1990s

Notes

References

External links
 

Parliamentary constituencies in Bangladesh
Jhenaidah District